Hiawatha is a 1952 American Western film based on the 1855 epic poem The Song of Hiawatha by Henry Wadsworth Longfellow, centering on Native Americans in pre-Columbian times. Directed by Kurt Neumann, with stars Vincent Edwards and Yvette Dugay, it became the final feature produced by the low-budget Monogram Pictures, a mainstay of Hollywood's Poverty Row.

Plot
Hiawatha, a member of the Ojibway tribe, is on a peace mission to the Dakotah tribe. He meets and falls in love with Minnehaha. The romance is obstructed by a threatened war between the two tribes, instigated by a hot-headed Ojibway tribe member. The war is averted and Hiawatha learns that he is actually the long-missing son of the Dakotah chief.

Cast
 Vince Edwards as Hiawatha (as Vincent Edwards)
 Yvette Dugay as Minnehaha
 Keith Larsen as Pau Pukkeewis
 Eugene Iglesias as Chibiabos (as Gene Iglesias)
 Armando Silvestre as Kwasind
 Michael Tolan as Ajawac
 Ian MacDonald as Chief Megissogwon
 Katherine Emery as Nokomis
 Morris Ankrum as Iagoo
 Stephen Chase as Lakku
 Stuart Randall as Mudjekeewis

Accusations of Communist propaganda
Hiawatha'''s original production planning schedule, in early 1950, was reported by Time magazine in September to have been put on hold due to the main character being a proponent of pacifism and speaking dialog "too close, for current U.S. taste, to the Communist 'peace' line". At the same time, the Los Angeles newspaper Illustrated Daily News, whose publisher, Manchester Boddy, was in the midst of an ultimately losing campaign for nomination as a strongly anti-Communist candidate in the California United States Senate election, published an interview with Monogram Pictures president Steve Broidy who stated that, "because of the tremendous influence that the motion picture industry exerts internationally, producers are being extremely cautious in preventing any subject matter to reach the screen which might possibly be interpreted as Communistic propaganda to even the slightest degree. The Hiawatha screenplay, written by a scenarist whose Americanism is unquestioned, still left us with the feeling that Communistic elements might conceivably misinterpret the theme of our picture, despite its American origin, and that is why we have postponed its production."Variety reported in January 1951 that Hiawatha resumed production, with Broidy quoted as explaining that "the avalanche of editorial comment which greeted our announcement convinced us unquestionably that the American public would not be dupes for any Communist line, and that our Hiawatha picture could only serve the highest ends of education and entertainment".

Contrary to Broidy's statement that the Hiawatha screenplay was "written by a scenarist whose Americanism is unquestioned", film and television historian Paul Mavis, who devotes a considerable portion of his DVD Talk review of Hiawatha to this controversial aspect of the film, posits that the name of the screenwriter, Arthur Strawn was, in fact, among those of Communists and sympathizers listed in the anti-Communist pamphlet, Red Channels, and states that "Hiawatha was his last official credit, no doubt before he was blacklisted (Others first blacklisted after June 1950). Describing it as a "[M]odest, respectful little Indian tale...lousy with Red Commie propaganda", Mavis details how "then-contemporary 1950s politics lie not so subtly beneath the so-called biographical surface, with the real Hiawatha's purported role as a peacemaker and tribe-uniter used as a framework for some thinly veiled jabs at American military might" and goes on to point out "how clearly screenwriter Strawn (with an assist by Dan Ullman) grafts Red-tinged Daily Worker pacifist carps about American muscle onto Hiawatha's efforts to unite his fellow tribesmen".

Mavis also describes that "[W]hen Hiawatha defeats Pau PukKeewis in their first death match, Hiawatha refuses to kill him, which the movie takes as another positive sign of the innate "rightness" of Hiawatha's pacifism. Of course what the movie doesn't comment on is the price of Hiawatha's pacifism: had Hiawatha killed the clearly evil, troublemaking Pau PukKeewis when he first had the chance, the many subsequent deaths caused by Pau PukKeewis's continued duplicitous war campaign, would not have happened." He concludes that "muscular Vince Edwards looks and sounds right as the soft-spoken, determined Hiawatha. Had Monogram and company stuck with this relatively realistic look at Indian life before the White man came, and ditched all the phony Cold War platitudes, Hiawatha might have turned out to be a minor little gem".

Evaluation in film guidesSteven H. Scheuer's Movies on TV provided 2 stars (out of 4) and called it a "[M]ildly entertaining adventure based on Longfellow's poem", while Leonard Maltin's Movie Guide had a somewhat lower opinion, giving 1½ stars (out of 4) and denigrating it as a "[J]uvenile low-budget version of the Longfellow classic."

Assigning 2 stars (out of 5), The Motion Picture Guide stated that "Edwards is cast as the title character in this family version of the classic Longfellow poem" and ultimately described it as "[A]n entertaining film for kids that masks its theme in a flurry of arrows and romance."

Among British references, Leslie Halliwell, in his Film Guide, gave no stars (Halliwell's top rating is 4), dismissing it as a "[M]uddled actioner which has little to do with Longfellow's poem."

References

External links

Hiawatha at TV Guide (1987 write-up was originally published in The Motion Picture Guide'')

1952 films
Films set in pre-Columbian America
Allied Artists films
Films based on works by Henry Wadsworth Longfellow
Films directed by Kurt Neumann
Films produced by Walter Mirisch
Works based on The Song of Hiawatha
1950s English-language films
American Western (genre) films
1952 Western (genre) films
1950s American films